This is a list of Communist Party of Canada 2011 federal election candidates by riding and province.

Alberta

British Columbia

Manitoba

Ontario

Quebec

References

External links 
Campaign web site

Communist Party Of Canada
2011